David Gibbs may refer to:
 David Gibbs (American football) (born 1968), American football coach and player
 David Gibbs (businessman), American CEO of Yum! Brands, Inc.
 David Gibbs (cricketer) (born 1967), Bermudian cricketer
 David Gibbs (New Zealand military officer) (1883–1946), commanding officer in the Occupation of German Samoa
 Dave Gibbs (musician) (born 1965), American singer-songwriter
 David Gibbs (naturalist) (born 1958), British naturalist
 David Gibbs (politician) (1936–2013), member of the Mississippi House of Representatives
 David Parker Gibbs (1911–1987), United States Army general

See also
David Gibb (disambiguation)